"Show Me Your Love" is a single by TVXQ and Super Junior 05, released via SM Entertainment on December 15, 2005. It was distributed as a CD single in both Korean and English, with the tracks "I Wanna Hold You" and "I'm Your Man" serving as B-sides.

Music video
The music video for the song "Show Me Your Love" starts with TVXQ and Super Junior taking photos for a winter photoshoot. Super Junior becomes exhausted and they retire to their seats. TVXQ brings up their spirit by starting the song, saying that TVXQ now has a new family, Super Junior. The two groups sing together under snow, in chapels, on ships, and other similar places that are surrounded by Christmas spirits. Most of the filming took place in Lotte World.

Reception
Commercially, "Show Me Your Love" peaked at number one on the MIAK album chart for December 2005 and sold 49,945 physical copies. It reentered the Gaon Album Chart five years later in February 2010 and attained a peak position of number 28.

Track listing
All songs were written, composed and arranged by Kenzie, who also took as a co-producer for album. Yoochun, Heechul, Shindong and Eunhyuk took part in rap lyrics for the title track Show Me Your Love.

Credits and personnel
Credits are adapted from the liner notes of Show Me Your Love physical single:

Musicians
TVXQvocal, background vocals (both for track 1 and 2)
Xiah Junsu
Micky Yoochunrap lyrics (track 1)
Hero Jaejoong 
Max Changmin
U-know Yunho
Super Junior 05vocal, background vocals (both for track 1 and 3)
Leeteuk
Heechulrap lyrics (track 1)
Han Geng 
Yesung 
Kang-in 
Shindongrap lyrics (track 1)
Sungmin 
Eunhyukrap lyrics (track 1)
Donghae
Siwon 
Ryeowook
Kibum

Additional musicians
Kim Jung-baeguitar (track 1, 3 and 4)
Kang Su-hodrum (track 2)
Choi Won-hyunbass (track 2)
Song Young-joopiano (track 2)
Shim Sang-wonstrings arrangement (track 2)
K-Stringsstrings (track 2)

Technical personnel
SM Entertainmentexecutive producer
Lee Soo-manproducer
Kenzielyrics (track 1, 2 and 3), composition, arrangement
Lee Seong-horecording, mixing (both for track 1 and 2)
Nam Koong-jinrecording, mixing (both for track 3)
Kim Dong-hoonstrings recording (track 2)
Park Dong-wonstrings recording assistant (track 2)
Kim Yong-seongrecording (track 1)
Jeon Seung-hunrecording assistant (track 1)
Jeon Hoonmastering
Kim Young-minexecutive supervisor

Studios
SM Yellow Tail Studiorecording, mixing (track 1 and 2)
SM Concert Hall Studiorecording, mixing (track 3)
T-Studiorecording (track 2)
Cool Soundrecording (track 1)
Sonic Koreamastering

Charts

Weekly charts

Monthly charts

Yearly charts

Sales

References

External links
 SM Entertainment – Official website

2005 singles
Super Junior songs
TVXQ songs
SM Entertainment singles
Korean-language songs